Francisco Mendoza may refer to:
Francisco Mendoza (footballer) (born 1985), Mexican footballer
Francisco Mendoza (bishop of Jaén) (died 1543), Spanish Roman Catholic bishop
Francisco Mendoza (bishop of Palencia) (died 1536), Spanish Roman Catholic bishop
Francisco Sarmiento Mendoza (1525-1595), Spanish canon lawyer and bishop